Aniruddha Joshi (born 7 November 1987) is an Indian cricketer. He made his List A debut for Karnataka in the 2015–16 Vijay Hazare Trophy on 10 December 2015. In January 2018, he was bought by the Royal Challengers Bangalore in the 2018 IPL auction. In the 2020 IPL auction, he was bought by the Rajasthan Royals ahead of the 2020 Indian Premier League.

References

External links
 

1987 births
Living people
Indian cricketers
Karnataka cricketers
Royal Challengers Bangalore cricketers
Cricketers from Bangalore